All in the Family is a 1970s American television sitcom.

All in the Family may also refer to:

 Episodes
 "All in the Family" (Body of Proof), an episode of Body of Proof
 "All in the Family" (CSI: NY), an episode of CSI: NY 
 "All in the Family" (Married... with Children episode), the last episode of the second season of Married... with Children

 Film & Television shows
 All in the Family (card game), themed after the sitcom
 All in the Family (film), English title of the 1975 Hong Kong film Hua Fei Man Cheng Chun
 The Kid Sister aka All in the Family, a 1945 American film directed by Sam Newfield
 "All in the Family" (Supernatural), a 2016 episode of the TV series Supernatural
 "All in the Family", a season 6 episode of ER

 Songs & Albums
 "All in the Family" (song), a 1998 Korn song
 All in the Family, a song from the 2003 album Deuce
 All in the Family, a 2004 album by The Kinleys
 All in the Family (Lordz of Brooklyn album), 1995

 Other
 All in the Family, a comic strip by Stan and Jan Berenstain which ran from 1965 through 1990 in McCall's and Good Housekeeping
 All in the Family, a 1966 novel by Edwin O'Connor
 All in the Family: Absolutism, Revolution, and Democracy in the Middle Eastern Monarchies, a 1999 book by Michael Herb